Luke's Freak Fest 2000 is a compilation album released by Luke, featuring new material from Luke and several other artists. It was released on March 7, 2000 by Luke Records through distribution from Loud Records (under the new-found structure of its merger into Sony Music's subsidiary Relativity Records only months prior) and featured production from Luther Campbell and Herb Powers. The album found decent success, peaking at #140 on the Billboard 200 and #37 on the Top R&B/Hip-Hop Albums.

Track listing
"Luke Intro" – :21  
"Freak Shawty" – 3:40  
"Girls Talkin' Shit" – :31  
"Slippery When Wet" – 4:21 (Featuring Big Punisher, Cuban Link, Armageddon) 
"Tigger & Luke" – :33  
"Creeping" – 3:32  
"Fucks up Bishops Credit" – :22  
"Get Rowdy" – 3:58 (Featuring DJ Uncle Al)
"Chief Vs Luke" – :47  
"Baby Be Mine" – 4:12 (Quad City DJ's) 
"Tear It Up" – 5:19 (No Good But So Good) 
"Talkin' 'Bout" – 4:31  
"Lucky Gets Lucky" – :43  
"Loving You" – 3:15 (Sylvia)  
"Holla at Jay Ski" – :36  
"Can I Holla" – 3:55 (Tightwork)  
"Shawna & Tracy Fight" – :49  
"Ain't Spending Nothing" – 3:02 (Featuring Krayzie Bone) 
"Hoe Surprise" – :28  
"Strokin'" – 4:16 (Featuring 69 Boyz) 
"The Show" – 3:17  
"Lay Your Ass Down" – 4:42  
"Club Rats" – 4:21  
"Bishop Don Juan" – 1:22  
"Dirty Bottom" – 3:50 (Goodie Mob, No Good But So Good) 
"What We Like" – 3:47 (95 South) 
"Slob on My Nob" – 1:25 (Tear Da Club Up Thugs)

Luther Campbell albums
2000 compilation albums